Christopher Cock was a London instrument maker of the 17th century, who supplied microscopes to Robert Hooke.  These microscopes were compound lens instruments, which suffered greatly from spherical aberration.

Bibliography
Chapman, Allan and Paul Kent (2005). Robert Hooke and the English Renaissance. Leominster: Gracewing.
Inwood, Stephen (2003).  The Forgotten Genius: The Biography Of Robert Hooke 1635-1703. San Francisco: Mcadam/Cage.
 Helen Purtle, The Billings Microscope Collection of the Medical Museum, Armed Forces Institute of Pathology (Second Edition) Washington, DC: Armed Forces Institute of Pathology, 1974 (Reprinted 1987).

Year of birth missing
Year of death missing
English inventors